Doug Costin (born October 5, 1997) is an American football defensive tackle for the Arlington Renegades of the XFL. He played college football at Miami (OH).

College career 
Costin played college football at Miami University in Oxford, Ohio. Costin was a three year starter at Miami, where he played in 50 career games with 178 total tackles and 17 sacks throughout his college career along with being named First-team All-MAC in 2019.

Professional career

Jacksonville Jaguars
Costin went undrafted in the 2020 NFL Draft. He was signed by the Jacksonville Jaguars on April 25, 2020.

On August 31, 2021, Costin was waived by the Jaguars and re-signed to the practice squad the next day.

Cincinnati Bengals
On January 18, 2022, the Cincinnati Bengals signed Costin to their practice squad. He was released on January 25.

Birmingham Stallions
Costin signed with the Birmingham Stallions of the United States Football League on May 20, 2022, and was subsequently moved to the inactive roster. He was transferred to the active roster later that day.

Pittsburgh Steelers
On July 19, 2022, Costin signed a one-year contract with the Pittsburgh Steelers. He was released on August 16, 2022.

Arlington Renegades
Costin was selected by the Arlington Renegades in the 2023 XFL Draft.

References

External links 
Miami (OH) bio

Living people
1997 births
Arlington Renegades players
Birmingham Stallions (2022) players
Cincinnati Bengals players
Jacksonville Jaguars players
Miami RedHawks football players
People from West Chester, Pennsylvania
Pittsburgh Steelers players
Players of American football from Pennsylvania
Sportspeople from Chester County, Pennsylvania